The 1980 Indiana Hoosiers football team was an American football team that represented Indiana University Bloomington in the 1980 Big Ten Conference football season. In their eighth season under head coach Lee Corso, the Hoosiers finished in a tie for sixth place in the Big Ten Conference (Big Ten), compiled a 6–5 (3–5 against Big Ten opponents), and outscored their opponents by a combined total of 255 to 235. The team played its home games at Memorial Stadium in Bloomington, Indiana.

The team's statistical leaders included quarterback Tim Clifford with 1,391 passing yards, Lonnie Johnson with 1,075 receiving yards and 66 points scored, and Nate Lundy with 459 receiving yards. Several Indiana players also ranked among the Big Ten leaders in various statistical categories, including the following:
 Lonnie Johnson led the Big Ten with 11 rushing touchdowns and 200 rushing attempts, ranked second with 1,075 rushing yards and 1,146 yards from scrimmage, and ranked third with 5.4 yards per rushing attempt. 
 Tim Wilbur led the Big Ten with 9.1 yard per punt return and 256 punt return yards.
 Tim Clifford ranked fourth in the Big Ten with a 53.0 pass completion percentage, 16 total touchdowns, and 7.0 yards per passing attempt, and ranked seventh with 1,391 passing yards.

Schedule

Roster

Game summaries

Iowa

On September 13, Indiana opened its season with a 16–7 loss to Iowa. Jeff Brown rushed for 176 yards and caught five passes in his first start as Iowa's tailback.

Bourbon Barrel rivalry
On September 20, the Hoosiers played the annual Bourbon Barrel rivalry game. Indiana defeated Kentucky, 36–30, at Lexington, Kentucky. The game was tied at 30–30 when Indiana intercepted a Kentucky pass at midfield with 1:01 remaining in the game. Indiana took the lead on a touchdown pass to Steve Corso (the son of Indiana head coach Lee Corso); Corso called the play the "old pine tree slant".

at Colorado
On September 27, Indiana defeated Colorado, 49–7, before a crowd of 40,219 at Folsom Field in Boulder, Colorado. Flanker Nate Lundy shattered Indiana's single game receiving record (previously 178 yards) with five catches for 256 yards and three touchdowns. After the game, coach Lee Corso said: "Nate Lundy had a great game. 'Doctor Deep' can run on anyone." Quarterback Tim Clifford also tied the school's single game passing yardage record (set in 1943 by Robert Hoernschemeyer), completing 11 of 14 passes for 345 yards and five touchdowns. Clifford also broke the school's career record with 262 completions. Mike Harkrader also became the school's career rushing leader with 2,791 yards.

Duke
On October 4, Indiana defeated Duke, 31–21, before a crowd of 43,120 at Memorial Stadium in Bloomington. Running back Lonnie Johnson tied Indiana's single game rushing record (set by Courtney Snyder in 1974) with 211 rushing yards against Duke. After the game, coach Lee Corso called Johnson "the best all-around back in the Big Ten."

Wisconsin
Indiana defeated Wisconsin, 24–0, in front of a homecoming crowd of 51,029 at Memorial Stadium in Bloomington. Indiana's defense held Wisconsin to 204 yards of total offense (only 65 in the second half) and had seven tackles for loss. Quarterback Tim Clifford completed 17 of 25 passes for 186 yards and two touchdowns.

at Ohio State

On October 18, Indiana lost to #9 Ohio State, 27–17, at Ohio Stadium in Columbus. Ohio State running back Calvin Murray rushed for 224 yards, the fourth highest single-game tally in Ohio State history to that time, on 35 carries and scored two touchdowns on his 22nd birthday. Indiana running back Mike Harkrader rushed for 117 yards on 18 carries. Harkrader became the seventh leading rusher in Big Ten history with 3,034 yards.

at Northwestern
On October 25, Indiana defeated Northwestern, 35–20, in Evanston. Lonnie Johnson rushed for 160 yards on 22 carries, and Mike Harkrader added 102 rushing yards.

Michigan
On November 1, #18 Michigan defeated Indiana, 35–0, at Memorial Stadium in Bloomington.  Michigan totaled 349 rushing yards, including 152 by Butch Woolfolk and 123 by Lawrence Ricks. Ricks scored two touchdowns in a span of 28 seconds, running 29 yards for the first, then scoring again after Indiana fumbled the ensuing kickoff.  Anthony Carter caught a 34-yard touchdown pass from Wangler, and Woolfolk added a 64-yard touchdown run in the fourth quarter. Michigan also intercepted four of Tim Clifford's passes.

at Minnesota
On November 8, Minnesota defeated Indiana, 31–7, in Minneapolis. Quarterback Tim Clifford was knocked out of the game in the first half by "a savage blindside tackle" by Jeff Schuh. Minnesota running back Garry White rushed for 145 yards and two touchdowns.

Illinois
On November 15, Indiana defeated Illinois, 26–24, in Bloomington. Indiana tailback Lonnie Johnson rushed for a school record 237 yards on 37 carries. Illinois quarterback Dave Wilson kept the game close as he passed for 403 yards and three touchdowns.

at Purdue

On November 22, in the annual battle for the Old Oaken Bucket, Purdue defeated Indiana, 24–23, in West Lafayette. Purdue led, 24–17, with 21 seconds left when Tim Clifford threw a touchdown pass to Steve Corso (Indiana coach Lee Corso's son). Rather than kick an extra point to tie the game, Indiana coach Corso called for a pass play to win the game; the pass was knocked down, and Purdue preserved a one-point margin of victory.

1981 NFL draftees

References

Indiana
Indiana Hoosiers football seasons
Indiana Hoosiers football